Pujali is a town and a municipality of the South 24 Parganas district in the Indian state of West Bengal. It is situated on the eastern banks of the Hooghly River. It is a part of the area covered by the Kolkata Metropolitan Development Authority (KMDA).

Geography

Area overview
Alipore Sadar subdivision is the most urbanized part of the South 24 Parganas district. 59.85% of the population lives in the urban areas and 40.15% lives in the rural areas. In the northern portion of the subdivision (shown in the map alongside) there are 21 census towns. The entire district is situated in the Ganges Delta and the subdivision, on the east bank of the Hooghly River, is an alluvial stretch, with industrial development

Note: The map alongside presents some of the notable locations in the subdivision. All places marked in the map are linked in the larger full screen map.

Location

Balarampur, Uttar Raypur, Buita, Benjanhari Acharial, Abhirampur and Nischintapur form a cluster of census towns around Budge Budge and Pujali, as per the map of the Budge Budge I CD block on the page number 167 in the District Census Handbook 2011 for the South 24 Parganas district.

Climate
Köppen-Geiger climate classification system classifies its climate as tropical wet and dry (Aw).

Demographics

According to the 2011 Census of India, Pujali had a total population of 37,047, of which 18,940 were males and 18,107 were females. There were 4,316 people in the age range of 0 to 6 years. The total number of literate people was 25,791, which constituted 69.6% of the population with male literacy of 73.0% and female literacy of 66.1%. The effective literacy (7+) of population over 6 years of age was 78.8%, of which male literacy rate was 82.6% and female literacy rate was 74.8%. The Scheduled Castes and Scheduled Tribes population was 5,480 and 937 respectively. Pujali had a total of 8,587 households as of 2011.

According to the 2001 Census of India, Pujali had a total population of 33,858. Males constitute 52% of the population and females 48%. It has an average literacy rate of 61%, higher than the national average of 59.5%: male literacy is 68%, and female literacy is 55%. 13% of the population is under 6 years of age.

Kolkata Urban Agglomeration
The following municipalities and census towns in the South 24 Parganas district were part of the Kolkata Urban Agglomeration in the 2011 census: Maheshtala (M), Joka (CT) (now under Kolkata Municipal Corporation), Balarampur (CT), Chata Kalikapur (CT), Budge Budge (M), Nischintapur (CT), Uttar Raypur (CT), Pujali (M) and Rajpur Sonarpur (M).

Civic administration

Municipality
It has jurisdiction over parts of the Pujali. It is divided into 15 wards. According to the 2022 municipal election, it is being controlled by the All India Trinamool Congress.

CD block HQ
The headquarters of the Budge Budge I CD block are located at Purba Nischintapur. The map of the CD block Budge Budge I on the page number 167 in the District Census Handbook 2011 for the South 24 Parganas district shows the headquarters of the CD block as being in Pujali.

Transport
Pujali is on the Budge Budge Trunk Road.

Budge Budge railway station is located nearby.

Healthcare
There is a primary health centre, with 6 beds, at Biraj Lakshmi (PO Pujali).

References

External links

Cities and towns in South 24 Parganas district
Neighbourhoods in Kolkata
Kolkata Metropolitan Area